State Route 666 (SR 666) is a  state route that runs between Zanesville and Dresden in the US state of Ohio. Most of the route is a rural two-lane highway and passes through both woodland and farmland.  For much of its path, SR 666 runs generally parallel to the east of the Muskingum River. The highway was first signed in 1937 on the same alignment as today. The whole highway was paved by 1955.

Route description
SR 666 begins at a traffic signal with SR 60 and SR 146, on the northeast side of Zanesville. The route heads east as a two-lane highway, before curving northeast. While passing through Zanesville the route passes woodland, with some commercial businesses. The highway makes a sharp curve due west, before another sharp curve northeast. After the second curve the route leaves Zanesville, running parallel to the Muskingum River and an Ohio Central Railroad track. The road makes a sharp curve northwest and passes through a one-lane 10'11"-clearance underpass under the Ohio Central Railroad track. After passing under the railroad track the route curves north-northeast and the railroad track curves due east. The roadway passes through the Zanesville State Forest Nursery, followed by a curve northwest, passing through the state forest nursery again. After leaving the state forest nursery, the highway passes through farmland heading due north. The route curves northeast passing through the state forest nursery for the last time and the highway has an intersection with County Road 40 (CR 40), in rural Jefferson Township. Following this intersection, SR 666 turns due west, before curving towards the north. This section of roadway passes mostly through farmland, with wooded areas when the route is close to the river. SR 666 ends at an intersection with SR 208 near Dresden, on the east bank of the Muskingum River.

SR 666 is not part of the National Highway System, a system of routes important to the nation's economy, mobility and defense. The highway is maintained by the Ohio Department of Transportation (ODOT). ODOT's 2010 annual average daily traffic (AADT) calculations showed that the lowest traffic levels were present on the section that is at the intersection with Washington Township Road 112 (Bateman Road), where only 510 vehicles used the highway daily; the peak traffic volume was 5,340 vehicles AADT along a section of SR 666 near its southern terminus.

History
SR 666 was established in 1937 along the same alignment between Zanesville and near Dresden within Muskingum County that it utilizes today. Between 1953 and 1955 the highway was paved. The highway has not experienced any major changes to its routing since 1955.

Major intersections

References

External links

 State Route 666 Endpoint Photos

666
Transportation in Muskingum County, Ohio